Epicephala acrobaphes is a moth of the family Gracillariidae. It is known from Queensland, Australia.

References

Epicephala
Moths described in 1900